The Main Missile and Artillery Directorate of the Ministry of Defense of the Russian Federation, commonly referred to by its transliterated Russian acronym GRAU, is a department of the Russian Ministry of Defense. It is subordinate to the Chief of Armament and Munition of the Russian Armed Forces, a vice-minister of defense.

The organization dates back to 1862 when it was established under the name Главное артиллерийское управление (ГАУ – GAU). The "R" from "rockets" was added to the title in 1960.

In particular, the GRAU is responsible for assigning GRAU indices to Russian army munitions and equipment.

Arsenals of the GRAU, according to Kommersant-Vlast in 2005, include the 60th at Kaluga, the 55th at Rzhev, the 75th at Serpukhov south of Moscow, (all three in the Moscow Military District) and the 80th at Gagarskiy, the 116th at Krasno-Oktyabrskiy and the 5th, all in the Volga–Urals Military District.

As of December 2021, the Chief of the GRAU is Major General Nikolay Romanovsky.

Current GRAU indices
GRAU indices are of the form   , sometimes with a further suffix  .  They may be followed by a specially assigned codename.  For example "2 S 19  Msta-S", the 2S19 Msta self-propelled howitzer, has the index 2S19, without suffix; Msta-S is the codename.

Misconceptions
Several common misconceptions surround the scope and originating body of these indices. The GRAU designation is not an industrial designation, nor is it assigned by the design bureau. In addition to its GRAU designation, a given piece of equipment could have a design name, an industrial name and a service designation.

For example, one of the surface-to-air missiles in the S-25 Berkut air defense system had at least four domestic designations:
 design name: La-205
 GRAU index: 5V7
 industry name: Article 205
 Soviet military designation: V-300

Some Soviet general-purpose bombs bore a designation that looked confusingly similar to GRAU.

Designation scheme
The first part of a GRAU index is a number indicating which of the several main categories of equipment a given item belongs to.  The second part, a Cyrillic character, indicates the subcategory. The third part, a number, indicates the specific model.  The optional suffix can be used to differentiate variants of the same model.

1 (Radio and electronics equipment)
 1K: Buran (the first Buran-class orbiter; see also "#11 (Rocketry and associated equipment)")
 1L: 1L14, the IFF detector for the 9K310 (Igla) air defense system
 1S: Radar (1S11, target detecting radar of 1S91 command and control vehicle of 2K12 Kub air defense system)
 1V: Artillery command vehicles (1V18/19 on BTR-60 chassis, 1V13/16 on MT-LBu chassis)
 1P: Firearms optic (1P87 optic on AK-12, 1P70 optic on SVDK). 1PN designates the firearms optic as a night vision device, e.g. 1PN51.

2 (Artillery systems)
 2A: Towed artillery systems (2A65 Msta-B)
 2B: Mortar Systems (2B9 Vasilek, 2B14 Podnos)
 2K: Air Defence Systems (2K11, Krug surface-to-air missile system; 2К12, Kub surface-to-air missile system, 2K22, Tunguska surface-to-air gun-missile system)
 2S: Self-propelled artillery systems (2S1 Gvozdika, 2S19 Msta-S)
 2U: Training equipment

3 (Army and naval missiles)
 3M: Various missiles (3M80 Moskit, 3M45 Granit)

4 (Naval missiles and army equipment (munitions, reactive armour, etc.))
 4G: Warheads (4G15, the high explosive/HEAT warhead for the P-15 Termit anti-ship missile)
 4K: Naval missiles (4K10, the submarine-launched ballistic missile R-27 (RSM-25) for D-5 "Zyb" system; 4K40, P-15 Termit missile)
 4P: Launchers
 4S: Launchers (4S95, the launcher of "Kinzhal/Klinok" (SA-15 Gauntlet) air defense complex)

5 (Air defense equipment)
 5Ae: Computers (5Ae26, a specialized multi-CPU computer with a performance of 1.5 MIPS)
 5B: Surface-to-air missile warheads (5B18, the warhead for the S-125's V-601 missile)
 5P: Surface-to-air missile launchers (5P75, the four-missile launcher for the S-125 air defense system)
 5V: Surface-to-air missiles (5V55, SAM for S-300 air defense system)
 5Ya: Surface-to-air missiles (5Ya23, a SAM for the S-75 air defense system)
 5#
 * 51T6 (SH-11/ABM-4 Gorgone), an exoatmospheric anti-ballistic missile interceptor for the A-135 air defense system
 * 53T6 (SH-08/ABM-3 Gazelle), an endoatmospheric interceptor for A-135 air defense system

6 (Firearms, air defense equipment)
 6B: Body armor (6B1; 6B13, for mountain troops; 6B23, MOLLE; 6B43, MOLLE for airborne, naval and special troops), helmets (6B6)
 6Ch: Firearm equipment (6Ch12, the PBS-1 flash suppressor and silencer; 6Ch63, AK modernize kit; 6Ch64, front grip)
 6E: Firearm equipment (6E7, flashlight)
 6G: Firearms (6G3, the RPG-7 man-portable, rocket-propelled grenade launcher; 6G17, the VOG-25 40 mm grenade cartridge)
 6Kh: Knives and bayonets (6Kh3, a sword-bayonet for the AKM)
 6P: Firearms (6P1, the 7.62 mm AKM, and 6P41/6P41M, PKP)
 6Sh: Firearm equipment (6Sh5, a rifle sling; 6Sh92, tactical vest; 6Sh104, SVD/VSS vest for sniper and backpack with rain cover and 2 side MOLLE pouches; 6Sh105, normal or digital tactical vest; 6Sh112, MOLLE tactical vest for PKM/PKP machine-gunner)
 6T: Firearm equipment (6T2, Samozhenkov's carriage for PKS machine gun)
 6Ts: Sights (6Ts1, the PSO-1 sight for the Dragunov sniper rifle)
 6U: Firearm equipment (6U1, personnel carrier vehicle carriage for PKB/PKBM machine gun)
 6V: Firearms (6V1, the Dragunov sniper rifle)
 6Yu: Firearm accessories kit (6Yu4, accessories kit for the AKM)
 6Zh: Firearm equipment (6Zh1M, a 100-round belt-box for the PKM machine gun)
 6L: Magazine (6L20, bakelite plastic 5.45×39mm magazine for the AK-74)

7 (Firearm munitions)
 7B: Ammunition (7B33, the 7.62×54mmR armour-piercing/incendiary round)
 7G: Grenades (7G1, the RKG-3 handheld HEAT grenade)
 7Kh: Training ammunition (7Kh1, the 12.7×108mm blank cartridge)
 7N: Ammunition (7N1, the 7.62×54mmR round for sniper rifles)
 7P: Rocket-propelled grenades (7P1, a 40 mm RPG-7 round)
 7S: Misc. ammunition (7S1, a signal false-fire of orange smoke)
 7T: Ammunition (7T2, the 7.62×54mmR tracer round)
 7U: Ammunition (7U1, the 5.45×39mm low speed (subsonic) US (Umenshennoy Skorosti; "Reduced Speed") cartridge)
 7Z: Ammunition (7Z1, the 14.5×115mm incendiary round)

Exceptions
 71Kh6: the US-KMO Prognoz-2 early warning system satellite
 73N6 Baikal-1: an automated air defense command and control system
 75E6 Parol-3: the IFF interrogator for the S-75M and S-125
 76N6: a low-altitude target detector radar

8 (Army missiles and rocketry)
 8A: Ballistic missiles
 8D: Rocket engines (mostly)
 8F: Warheads
 8K: Missiles (8K51, 8K63 Dvina, 8K64, 8K67, 8K71, 8K81, 8K84)
 8P: Expendable launch systems
 8S: Missile propulsion stages

9 (Army missiles, UAVs)
 9A: Launchers (9A52, the chassis of the Smerch MLRS)
 9F: Training and equipment systems (9F827 of the Smerch system)
 9K: Systems (9К33, Osa surface-to-air missile system; 9К115-2, Metis-M anti-tank missile system; 9K310, the Igla air defense system)
 9M: Missiles (9M133 Kornet) and 9M62, T-92 UAV from aerial reconnaissance complex "Tipchak";
 9P: Launchers (9P140, the chassis of the Uragan MLRS)
 9S: 9S737, Ranzhir mobile command center
 9T: Transporter-loaders and re-supply vehicles (9T234 of the 9K58 Smerch system, 9T244 of the 9K331 Tor system)

10 (Equipment)
 10P: Sights (10P19, the PGO-7V sight for RPG-7V grenade launcher)
 10R: Radios (10R30 Karat-2, a radio transmitter)

11 (Rocketry and associated equipment)
 11A: Rocketry (11A51, the Korolev N-1 heavy-lift launcher, 11A511, the Soyuz launcher)
 11B: Nuclear thermal rocket engines (11B91 (RD0410); 11B97)
 11D: Rocket engines (11D43, the RD-253 liquid fuel rocket engine (First stage of Proton space launcher))
 11F: Satellites (11F67 Molniya-1, a telecom satellite; 11F35 K1 Buran (the first Buran-class shuttle; see also "#1 (Radio and electronics equipment)"); 11F654 GLONASS satellites; 11F94 LK, a lunar lander)
 11G: Equipment (11G12, a refuelling station)
 11K: Rocketry (11K25 Energia, a heavy-lift rocket for the Buran–class shuttle)
 11M: Onboard equipment (11M243, solar array actuators for the 11F624 Yantar-2K satellite)
 11P: Ground equipment (11P825, the launch complex for the 11K25)
 11S: Rocket stages (11S59, the 1st and 2nd stages ("unit A") of the Soyuz rocket)

14 (Rocketry and associated equipment)
 14A: Rockets (14A15, is the "Soyuz-2-1v")
 14D: Rocket engines (14D30, the "Briz" booster's S5.98M liquid fuel engine)
 14F: Satellites (14F10, the IS-MU Naryad anti-satellite weapon)
 14I: Ground equipment (14I02, the ground equipment for the "Briz" booster's 8P882 system)
 14P: Ground equipment (14P72, the service system for the "Briz" booster)
 14S: Boosters (14S12, the "Briz" booster)
 14T: Ground equipment (14T81, the storage equipment for the "Briz" booster)

15 (Strategic Missile Forces equipment)
 15A: Intercontinental ballistic missiles (15A14 and 15A18, the R-36M (SS-18 Satan) ICBM; 15A15, the UR-100MR (SS-17 Spanker) ICBM)
 15B: Warheads
 15D: Rocket engines (mostly)
 15F: Warheads
 15N: Command and control vehicles
 15P: Silo-based launchers (mostly)
 15U: ICBM ground equipment
 15Zh: ICBMs and tactical ballistic missiles (15Zh45, the RT-21M Pioneer (SS-20 Saber) TBM)

17 (Rocketry and associated equipment)
 17D: Misc. rocket engines (17D58Ae, the stabilization and orientation engine of the "Briz-M" booster)
 17F: Satellites (17F15 Raduga-1, a telecommunications satellite)
 17K: Space-based systems (17K114, a space-based reconnaissance and targeting system)
 17P: Ground equipment (17P31, the start system for 11K25)
 17S: Rocket stages (17S40, Unit D of the Proton launcher)
 17U: Ground equipment (17U551, the "Briz-M" booster testing system)

See also
 Designations of Russian towed artillery
 NATO Reporting Name

Notes

References

 
 Dictionary of GRAU designations at

Further reading
 Lennox, Duncan (March 1993). "Russian Missile Designators". Jane's Intelligence Review, p. 120.
 Zaloga, Steven (August 1994). "Russian Missile Designations". Jane's Intelligence Review, p. 342–349.

External links
 History of the GRAU 

Defence agencies of Russia
Military of Russia
Military of the Soviet Union